Lawrence USD 497 is a public unified school district headquartered in Lawrence, Kansas, United States.  The district includes the communities of Lawrence, Clinton, Pleasant Grove, and nearby rural areas.  It was organized in 1965 and currently serves 11,427 students from pre-Kindergarten to grade 12 and maintains an early childhood center (pre-k), 13 elementary schools, four middle schools, two high schools, a K-12 virtual school, and an adult learning center.

School Board 
USD 497 is currently served by seven elected officials who serve a four-year term without salary.

Schools 
The school district operates the following schools:

High schools
 Lawrence Free State High School
 Lawrence High School

Middle schools
 Liberty Memorial Central Middle School
 Billy Mills Middle School

 Southwest Middle School
 West Middle School

Elementary schools
 Broken Arrow
 Cordley
 Deerfield
 Hillcrest
 Langston Hughes
 New York
 Pinckney
 Prairie Park
 Quail Run
 Schwegler
 Sunflower
 Sunset Hill
 Woodlawn

Additional services
 Lawrence Virtual Schools, a K–12 and high school program located in former Centennial Elementary School
 Adult Learning Center, helps adult obtain a GED, located in the Lawrence High School annex
Lawrence Diploma-Completion Program, helps adult obtain a Lawrence High, Free State or Perry-Lecompton high school diploma, located in the Malls Shopping Center
 The Lawrence College & Career Center, Which offers opportunities for high school students to earn college credits and take classes to prepare them for various careers.
 Kennedy Early Childhood Center, which houses Tiny-K Early Intervention, early childhood special education, at-risk pre-k, and other community early childhood programs.

Former schools in Lawrence
Former schools in the Lawrence area include: Lake View School, Sigel School, No. 6 School, Pleasant Valley School, Franklin School, Barker School, Bracket School, Learnard School, White School, Oak Hill School, Bismarck School, Riggs School, Model School, Lane School, Quincy School, Vermont School, Lawrence High School (1890-1923, moved to Liberty Memorial High School, now Liberty Memorial Central Middle School), McAllister School, Centennial Elementary, East Heights Elementary, India Elementary, Kaw Valley Elementary, Grant Elementary, Wakarusa Valley Elementary, and Kennedy Elementary.

See also
 Kansas State Department of Education
 Kansas State High School Activities Association
 List of high schools in Kansas
 List of unified school districts in Kansas

References

External links
 

Lawrence, Kansas
School districts established in 1965
School districts in Kansas
Education in Douglas County, Kansas
Education in Leavenworth County, Kansas
Education in Jefferson County, Kansas
1965 establishments in Kansas